Durotrigensia is a genus of ammonites (Ammonitida) in the perisphinctoid family Parkinsoniidae.

Durotrigensia is sometimes considered a subgenus of Parkinsonia and is related also to Oraniceras and Okribites.

These cephalopods lived during the Bajocian stage of the Middle Jurassic some 170 to 164 million years ago.

Description
These large to giant ammonites have sharp and finely ribbed inner whorls and smooth outer whorls, without tubercles or lappets.

References

Ammonites - Parkinsonia (Durotrigensia) sp. entry

Jurassic ammonites
Bajocian life